Kochi (Malayalam: കൊച്ചി Kochi, formerly known as Cochin) is a major port city in the Indian state of Kerala. The city is widely known as the commercial or economic capital of the state of Kerala.
 
The road infrastructure in Kochi has not been able to meet the growing traffic demand and hence traffic congestion is a major problem in the city. A comprehensive transport development plan has been included in the Kochi Masterplan hoping to improve the transport infrastructure. Kochi Metro, the rapid transit system for the city was inaugurated on 17 June 2017. A Suburban Railway system, intended to considerably ease congestion, is also to be built in the near future. Kochi bagged the city with most sustainable transport system award instituted by the Union ministry of housing and urban affairs in 2021.

Roads

Most roads in Kochi are under the control of the city corporation, State PWD and National Highway Authority. Many roads in the city follow a North-South direction with two East-West corridors.

Highways 

Kochi is part of the North-South Corridor of India's National Highway System via the NH 47. NH 66, the seventh longest highway in India, connects Kochi with Mumbai, via Kozhikode and Mangalore on the western coast of India. The NH 47 originating from Salem connects Kochi with cities like Coimbatore via Thrissur and Palakkad and also connects with state capital Thiruvananthapuram and terminates at Kanyakumari. NH 49 is another highway, connecting Kochi with Dhanushkodi in Tamil Nadu via Munnar and Madurai. Two smaller national highways, NH 47A connecting to Willingdon Island and NH 47C, connecting NH 47 to Vallarpadom from Kalamassery. NH 47 has a  bypass road connecting Aroor to Edappally junction. The city is also connected with several state highways like SH 15, SH 16, SH 41, SH 63, SH 66. The state government has constructed an expressway called Seaport-Airport Road running parallel to NH 47 bypass road at Maradu junction to Kalamasserry junction. Phase II, proposed an alternative road to directly to Airport. The ever-increasing traffic congestion has necessitated the construction of flyovers at many key junctions on the national highways in Kochi. The works on Edapally flyover has commenced and a flyover at Palarivattom junction has also been sanctioned

City roads 

Mahatma Gandhi Road is a  arterial road and commercial high street in Kochi alongside which lies the CBD of the city. The  Chittoor Road is the oldest arterial road that connects the city to northern suburbs like Chittoor, Panchalam and Vaduthala. Another major arterial road is the  Marine Drive Road which extends southward as Park Avenue and Foreshore Roads and northward as the Marine drive bay road. The youngest arterial road is the  Kaloor-Kadavanthra Road, constructed in 2002 as an effort to reduce congestion at MG Road and Chitoor Road and provide an alternative for commuters to reach the major southern junction of Kadavanthra from the northern junction of Kaloor.
The city has only 2 east–west corridors, creating one of the most congested traffic at the stretch. The  Sahodharan Ayyappan Road, the busiest and second most important arterial road connects MG Road to Kochi Bypass Road at Vytilla Junction at the southern side and the  Kaloor Road connects Banerjee Road to NH 47 at Edappally Junction. The  stretch of Edapally - Aroor bypass road has turned out to be an important arterial road in Kochi
. A third east–west corridor is planned connecting MG Road with NH 47 known as Pullepady-Thammanam road, for which first phase has started with construction of Pullepady Rail-Over Bridge.

The main railway line cut Ernakulam city into 2 halves which are interconnected with three rail-over bridges (ROBs), which are one of the major bottlenecks due to being narrow bridges.

Fort Kochi has the maximum number of roads, mostly narrow in nature, due to presence of several heritage properties and thickly populated areas. Indira Gandhi Road is the main arterial road in Willingdon island that runs parallel to western coastal side of the island connecting Ernakulam Wharf with NH 47A.

Public transport 

For transport within the city, buses and taxis are available throughout the day. The city has a very fast and efficient bus transport system, mainly dominated by private operators, known as Red-Buses. The red buses offer no-frills travel within the city, forming a major backbone of public transport. However the reckless driving and competitive tendency among red-buses has been heavily criticised by the public. Despite its mounting public criticism on reckless driving, the punctuality and reliability of services often silence the critics to a great extent.

Mayor Soumini Jain and MLA Hibi Eden are planning to join hands with a city-based think tank, Centre for Public Policy Research (CPPR) to promote public transport systems. CPPR has come up with one-year programme that aims to promote public transport with a research to quantify its impact. The programme will commence in October 2017.

In 2010, the state public transport company, KSRTC started city services due to frequent complaints against red-buses, which has been praised for its efficient and controlled services. KSRTC operates two classes of service: a basic no-frills service known as Thiru-Kochi which has the same fare system as the red-buses. These buses are distinguishable by their blue-white livery and are JNNURM funded transport services. The JNNURM transport services operated by KSRTC offer premium air-conditioned low-floor bus services known as Orange Buses and non-air conditioned semi low floor buses known as Yellow Buses. Both the buses connect the central business district areas of Kochi with the nearby suburbs. Currently these premium bus services are available as per the schedule published by Kerala State Road Transport Corporation. The URL is:http://www.keralartc.com/html/JnNURM-KOCHI-TimeTable.doc. At present, 630 intra-buses are authorised to operate inside the city. The city also caters to nearly 2100 long-distance private buses, which include 466 inter-city state buses.

Most of the buses run primarily on four major routes, known as the Big 4 routes, though there are 160 official authorised routes to operate connecting 60 destinations in the city and nearby suburbs. The most popular route is the Aluva-Fort Kochi Route, which covers almost all the city areas. There is no routing numbering system, rather all buses carry destination boards with important bus stops marked below.

The city has primarily four major bus stations:

 Kaloor Bus station which is a major terminus used by privately operated long-distance buses and local red-buses. It is also a major stop for private mofussil services.
 KSRTC Central Bus Station in the south, which is exclusively operated by KSRTC inter-state/inter-city buses. Buses of neighbouring state transport corporations also operates their services from this bus station.
 KSRTC Jetty Station, located near Central Boat Jetty in Park Avenue, is used by KSRTC city and short distance services.
 Fort Kochi Bus Terminus, located near Fort Kochi beach, is a major bus station for both private and KSRTC City services.

To ease congestion within the city limits, a large integrated public transport terminus is planned at Vytilla known as Integrated Mobility Hub, which will act as a converging point for various modes of public transportation like intra-city and long distance buses, metro rail and boat services. The first phase of the mobility hub has been completed and commissioned in February 2011. The Mobility Hub plans to provide space for 170 buses, 2000 car bays, 50 inter-state buses parking bays, 5,000 two- and three-wheeler parking bays and a boat jetty with 3 piers for providing water ferry transport. The Vyttila station of the Kochi Metro will also be situated at the hub. A shopping mall and commercial towers are planned in the second phase to sustain with additional revenues.

On-street Taxi cabs are rare but can be easily hired from taxi stands located all over the city. Popular online taxi aggregation apps like Uber, Ola Cabs and others operate ride hailing services for taxi's and auto rickshaws. Auto rickshaws can also be hailed on the street.

Like many other cities, two-wheeler vehicles like motor bikes, scooters, cycles contribute 35% of the vehicle population in the city, which is extremely popularly among the locals. Kochi being a major financial and commercial center, there is a sharp rise in private vehicles plying on the city roads thereby contributing to road congestion.

Kochi Port

Being one of the safest harbours in the Arabian Sea, Kochi ranks among India's major seaports. It is the first transshipment terminal in India. The port, administered by a statutory autonomous body known as the Cochin Port Trust, offers facilities like berths for handling cargo and passenger ships, cargo handling equipment, storage accommodation, dry dock, bunkering facilities, and a fisheries harbour. Cochin Port regularly handles various international passenger cruisers. As of 2019, Spectrum of the Seas, is the largest passenger cruiser to call at Kochi. Kochi is the first home port in India to operate international cruises. The service was started in December 2009 and was operated by Louis Cruises with regular trips to Maldives and Sri Lanka.

A container transshipment facility, known as International Container Transshipment Terminal, Kochi has been commissioned at Vallarpadom. Being constructed in three stages, the first phase of the terminal was commissioned on 11 Feb 2011. This can handle cargo up to one million TEUs (twenty-foot equivalent units) per annum. On completion of the third phase, the terminal will be able to handle 4 million TEUs of cargo per annum. The terminal is presently being operated by the Dubai Ports World (DPW), which will operate it for 30-years after which the control will come back to the Cochin Port Trust.

The Kochi International Marina is a marina in the city of Kochi. It is located in the eastern coast of the Bolgatty Island in the premises of the Bolgatty Palace, a 'heritage hotel'. The Kochi Marina is the only marina in India. It is owned by the Kerala Tourism Development Corporation. The marina provides berthing facility for yachts and also offers services like fuel, water, electricity and sewage pump-outs for boats. The marina is close to the international maritime route at the south west coast of the Indian Peninsula, with favourable conditions and minimum tidal variations throughout the year.

Airports

Kochi has an international airport, known as the Cochin International Airport , which is about 25 km north of the city. Unlike most Indian airports (which are controlled by the Airports Authority of India), Kochi airport is owned by Cochin International Airport Limited, a public limited company owned by a large number of Non Resident Indians, major Indian corporations, and the government of Kerala (which holds a majority interest). It is thus the first international airport in India built without Central Government funds. Having a 3,400-metre runway, one of the largest in Asia, the airport is equipped to operate any type of aircraft. It currently is the fourth busiest International airport in India. Currently in expansion mode, the airport has been made ready to accommodate the super jumbo Airbus 380. The Airport is connected with most of the cities in the Middle-East and South East Asia with nearly sixteen international flight carriers operating to the city. Apart from this, the city is well connected to all major metros and cities of India with seven domestic carriers operating nationwide air services. On August 18, 2015, it became the world's first fully solar energy powered airport with the inauguration of the dedicated solar plant.

The city has a second airport, INS Garuda, operated by the Indian Navy, whose southern headquarters is located in Kochi. Commissioned on 11 May 1953, it is the oldest operating air station of the Indian Navy. This airport is however not open to the public, and is solely used by the navy and by important government dignitaries visiting the city.

Ferry 

Apart from international cruises, domestic ferry and cruises operate in Kochi. Regular inter-island boat services operated by Kerala Shipping and Inland Navigation Corporation (KSINC), the state Water Transport Authority, and of private ownership are available from the High Court Jetty and the Ernakulam Central jetty at Park Avenue to various places. The Junkar ferry for the transshipment of vehicles and passengers between the various islands are operated between Ernakulam and Vypin, and between Vypin and Fort Kochi. However, construction of the Goshree bridges (which links Kochi's various islands) has made ferry transport less important. Backwaters cruises are one of the most important tourist activities in the city. KSINC operates large luxury cruise vessel called Sagar-Rani for high seas cruise parties. Apart from KSINC, numerous of private operators provide private cruise vessels for short leisure trips across the backwaters.

Kochi Metro Rail Limited (KMRL) has also launched boat services between Vyttila and Kakkanad as "City Water Bus" recently. The service is expected to be extended to more areas like Thevara soon.

Railways

At present, there is no intra-city rail transport system in Kochi. The inter-city rail transport system in the city is administered by the Southern Railway Zone of the Indian Railways. The major railway stations in Kochi metropolitan area are – Ernakulam Junction, Aluva, and Ernakulam Town, followed by less busier stations at Tripunithura and Angamaly and passenger halt stations at Edappally and Kalamassery. The South Railway Station is one of the busiest railway stations in South India, with more than 128 scheduled train services daily. The Junction Railway station currently has six platforms with two terminal gates. The main terminal located on the western side is the older structure, constructed in 1932. A food plaza and reservation counter are located on the west side. The East terminal is a new structure, constructed by GCDA, as a counter-measure to reduce traffic congestion on the South Rail-Over Bridge, by allowing passengers from the eastern side to access the east gate. However the terminal is not fully open to the public.

The North Railway Station is another station situated in the northern side of the city, mainly catering to long-distance services that bypass the Ernakulam Junction, and also as an additional halt station for many trains. A larger terminal in north has been opened to the public as of 27 November 2010. Cochin Harbour Terminus located in the Willingdon island is the third railway station in the city, though it has been closed down temporarily. Cochin Harbour Terminus is a heritage structure constructed by the British in 1946. Due to the presence of a few cracks on the Venduruthy Railway bridge connecting the mainland with the Willingdon island, the service to this station was temporarily suspended. Work on a new railway line has commenced and the station will be reopened soon. Edapally Railway Station is a smaller halt station for passenger services and a few express trains. The major stations at Aluva and Thripunithura and the halting station at Kalamassery, serves the outskirts of the city and the surrounding metropolitan area.

There is a historic station named as Ernakulam Terminus (station code ERG) situated behind the High Court. Great personalities like Mahatma Gandhi and The Viceroy have visited Cochin through this old majestic railway station. Ernakulam Terminus was the first station to serve the city but had to be abandoned in the early 60's. Now, Southern Railway plans to renovate the station into the central station for the city and for proposed suburban railway system, because the pressure on the Ernakulam Junction railway station has been increasing.

In addition, the Southern Railway is set to start a suburban railway system in Ernakulam, connecting nearby towns and cities by introducing MEMU services. The first MEMU line between Ernakulam and Kollam was opened in 2012 and a second one between Ernakulam and Palakkad was started in 2013 Other MEMU lines under consideration include Thrissur-Ernakulam and Ernakulam-Kottayam corridors for which work is underway.

Kochi Metro Rail 

A rapid transit system, intended to considerably ease congestion was opened to public on 17 June 2017 by Narendra Modi, the Prime Minister of India. At present, 21 stations from Aluva to Thaikoodam are active. The first phase will serve a distance of 28 km with a total of 25 stations. The first phase is being set up at an estimated cost of INR5181 crore (US$790 million). Recently, KMRL (Kochi Metro Rail Limited) has decided to extend the project to Tripunithura in the first phase itself. DMRC has started with the preliminary works such as widening of roads. It has also been decided that DMRC will build an INR135 crore (US$21 million) flyover at Edappally to ease the traffic congestion. In phase I, an elevated route is proposed, spanning 25 km from Aluva to Petta with 22 stations.

The 11.2-km Phase-II will be from Jawaharlal Nehru Stadium at Kaloor to Infopark via Kakkanad at an estimated cost of Rs.2,017.46 crore.

Distance from Kochi to major cities/towns & tourist centres

References

External links

 Cochin Port Trust
 Cochin Airport